Godefroy de la Roche Vanneau was bishop of Langres from 1139. He was a prominent aide to his cousin, Bernard of Clairvaux. He was appointed a prior of the Clairvaux Abbey in 1128. He joined the Second Crusade and urged King Louis VII of France to attack Constantinople in 1147.

References

Sources 

Bishops of Langres
Christians of the Second Crusade
French Cistercians